Terrance Patrick Gannon (born November 1, 1963, in Joliet, Illinois) is a sportscaster for NBC Sports and the Golf Channel, currently announcing golf, gymnastics, and figure skating.

Gannon played basketball for North Carolina State University, and under coach Jim Valvano, he was a member of the 1983 Wolfpack "Cardiac Pack" national championship-winning team. He was recognized as an Academic All-American twice, was NC State's all-time leading free throw shooter in 1983, and was ranked the second all-time Wolfpack player in career free throw accuracy.

Gannon began his early broadcasting career announcing for a variety of sports, mostly on cable outlets. In 1991, he began working for ABC; in the early 1990s, he started announcing for figure skating. In 2010, he began working for the Golf Channel; by 2016, he had become the lead play-by-play announcer for figure skating at NBC. In 2018, he began calling gymnastics and was a commentator for the sport during the 2020 Summer Olympics in Tokyo.

Early life and career
Gannon was born and raised in Joliet, Illinois, to Jim Gannon and Mary Gann. Upon his father's recommendation, he took four years of tap dancing lessons from his mother, who had taught tap dancing for 30 years, because he thought it would be good for his son's coordination. Gannon began his basketball career at Joliet Catholic High School, where his father was a coach.

Gannon attended North Carolina State University (NC State) in Raleigh, North Carolina, where he played college basketball as part of the Wolfpack team under coach Jim Valvano, where he was recognized as an Academic All-American twice and NC State's all-time leading free throw shooter. In 1983, he was a part of the "Cardiac Pack", which upset the Houston Cougars for the NCAA title. In 1983, Gannon was the leading three-point shooter in the United States. He hit 85.4 percent of his free throw attempts and was ranked the second all-time Wolfpack player in career free throw accuracy.

After graduating with a degree in history from NC State in 1985, he worked as a graduate assistant for Valvano for a year, intending to become a basketball coach. He briefly played professional basketball in Europe, but on the advice of Valvano, left the sport for broadcasting. In 2018, on the 35th anniversary of their win, NC State inducted the entire 1983 men's basketball team into its Athletic Hall of Fame.

Broadcasting career
Gannon has announced a wide variety of sporting events and has been called one of the "most versatile" announcers in TV sports and "the man who knows every game". Fellow commentators Tara Lipinski, Johnny Weir, and Nastia Liukin credit Gannon with their development as analysts. Lipinski stated that Gannon's depth of knowledge, experience, and "the way he brings natural, genuine conversation into the booth" made his style "compelling". Gannon's focus as a commentator for the Olympics was exposing general fans to sports they viewed rarely, only every four years.

Early career
In 1986, Gannon began broadcasting on Valvano's TV and radio shows for regionally televised basketball games. He served as a regular college basketball game analyst for Raycom Sports, Prime Network, Jefferson-Pilot Sports, Sports South, and Home Team Sports between 1987 and 1994, and as a play-by-play announcer for Prime Sports and Jefferson-Pilot's coverage of college baseball. Gannon credits Valvano for his career, noting that the coach had told his players that basketball "shouldn't be your entire life, it shouldn't consume you". From 1990 to 1994, Gannon was the announcer for the Charlotte Knights, a Minor League Baseball team in Charlotte.

ABC and ESPN
In 1991, Gannon started working for ABC as a commentator for college basketball. He also was an announcer on the weekly show Wide World of Sports. While working at Wide World of Sports, Gannon said that his biggest broadcasting influences were Harry Caray and Al Michaels.

Starting in the early 1990s, after being asked to travel to Tokyo, Japan, to cover a professional figure skating event, Gannon served as host for ABC's figure skating coverage, teaming with former Olympic skaters Peggy Fleming and Dick Button at most major competitions. As sports reporter Barry Jacobs stated, figure skating was "a sport he had not followed", but like every new sport, he approached it with "scholarly zeal" and "as if it was a history project". He would learn a sport's rules, key figures from its past and present, and for the purpose of sounding authentic to its fans, its "idiosyncratic language".  Gannon told reporter Barry Wilner that he would also talk about what he knew about the new sport and avoid unfamiliar topics until he learned more about it. Eventually, although he was most closely associated with figure skating and golf, with what Jacobs called "his warm, authoritative voice and understated manner", Gannon has announced for a wide variety of sporting events.

In 1993, Gannon began broadcasting for ESPN and ABC (which was merged with ESPN), covering play-by-play coverage for college basketball and football; by 2001, he had covered three post-season bowl games. He was an announcer on ABC's coverage of the PGA Tour and the Champions Tour and announced the Tour de France, which Jacobs called Gannon's "perhaps his greatest challenge", three times.  In 2001, ABC reported that Gannon hosted the Belmont Stakes once and three times called the play-by-play at the Little League World Series. By the time he left ABC, Gannon had also covered the NBA, WNBA, horse racing, tennis, beach volleyball, skiing, supercross motorcycle racing, mountain biking, and golf. He announced for the 2002 FIFA World Cup, the 2003 FIFA Women's World Cup, WTA professional tennis, the 2004 Indianapolis 500, 2006 Belmont Stakes, the Special Olympics, the Goodwill Games, and hosted ABC's college football studio show. For six years, he hosted the Tournament of Roses Parade.

In 2018, Gannon told sports reporter Helen Ross that out of all the sports he has called, he found golf the hardest, even though he played it and had been a fan of the sport since childhood. He played golf in clubs near his home in Los Angeles, but most of his golf was played on the road, with former golf pros and fellow broadcasters like his Golf Channel broadcast partner, six-time major champion Nick Faldo, as well as with Craig Perks, Billy Kratzert, Matt Gogel, Jim Gallagher Jr., and Curt Byrum.

NBC Sports
In 2010, Gannon joined the broadcast team of the Golf Channel, which is owned by the NBC Sports Group. NBC Sports also called him one of their "most versatile voices". He served as play-by-play announcer on the PGA Tour, the LPGA Tour, Olympic figure skating and gymnastics, and college basketball. He has covered five Olympic Games, including serving as studio host and play-by-play commentator for figure skating, short track, rowing, canoeing, and golf.

In 2014, Gannon was enlisted as a play-by-play commentator for figure skating at the 2014 Winter Olympics in Sochi, Russia. NBC needed backup announcers for their daytime broadcasts of figure skating, and so at first, he was slotted to work with 1998 Olympic champion Tara Lipinski and three-time U.S. national champion Johnny Weir separately. The trio recognized their chemistry and requested that they call the competition together; the result was the 10 best weekday daytime ratings in NBC's history. They were promoted to the network's lead figure skating announcing team the following season. Lipinski and Weir reported that Gannon "upped his game" with his wardrobe after working with them. Lipinski called Gannon "dapper" and "stylish"; she and Weir reported that she and Weir had helped Gannon with accessories such as cuff links and Hermès pocket squares. In 2017, Gannon signed a five-year contract extension with NBC and the Golf Channel.

In 2018, Gannon, Lipinski, and Weir announced figure skating and the Closing Ceremony at the Winter Olympics in PyeongChang, South Korea. Gannon also called ice dancing with former ice dancer Tanith White. Also in 2018, Gannon began commentating for gymnastics, with 1984 gold medalist Tim Daggett and 2008 all-around champion Nastia Liukin. Gannon said that he considered calling gymnastics at a high level "an honor".

Career timeline

Assignments timeline
1987–1994: college basketball analyst  for Raycom Sports and Jefferson-Pilot Sports
1990–1994: announcer for the class AAA baseball team the Charlotte Knights
1991–1994: play-by-play announcer for Jefferson-Pilot's coverage of college baseball
1991–1994: college basketball analyst for ABC and ESPN
1995–2009: college basketball play-by-play for ABC and ESPN
1995–1998: play-by-play, Wide World of Sports
1995–2009; play-by-play, College Football on ABC
1995–2008: lead play-by-play, figure skating on ABC
1999–2013: tower announcer/host, PGA Tour on ABC and Golf on ESPN
2004–2012: lead play-by-play, WNBA on ESPN
2010–present: tower announcer/host, Golf Channel
2010–present: lead play-by-play, figure skating, NBC Sports
2010–2013: play-by-play, NBA on ESPN
2013–present: substitute host, Golf Channel on NBC

Major events

1995–1997 Tour de France, ABC studio host
1995–1996 Little League World Series, ABC
1999 Little League World Series, ABC
2002 FIFA World Cup, ABC studio host
2003 FIFA Women's World Cup, ABC studio host
2004 Indianapolis 500, ABC studio host
2006 Belmont Stakes, ABC studio host
2010 Winter Olympics, Universal Sports daytime host
2012 Summer Olympics, NBC commentator, rowing and canoeing
2014 Winter Olympics, NBC commentator, figure skating and short track speed skating
2016 Summer Olympics, NBC main tower host, golf
2018 Winter Olympics, NBC commentator, figure skating (including ice dancing), Closing Ceremony
2020 Summer Olympics (2021), NBC commentator, gymnastics, Closing Ceremony
2022 Winter Olympics, NBC commentator, figure skating (including ice dancing), Closing Ceremony

References

1963 births
Living people
American horse racing announcers
American television sports announcers
Association football commentators
Baseball announcers
Basketball players from Illinois
College basketball announcers in the United States
College football announcers
Cycling announcers
Figure skating commentators
Golf writers and broadcasters
Motorsport announcers
National Basketball Association broadcasters
NC State Wolfpack men's basketball players
Olympic Games broadcasters
Sportspeople from Joliet, Illinois
Women's National Basketball Association announcers
American men's basketball players
Minor League Baseball broadcasters